828 Lindemannia is a minor planet orbiting the Sun with an orbital period of five years and 255 days. It was discovered on 29 August 1916 at the University of Vienna by Johann Palisa. It is named after Adolph Friedrich Lindemann, a British astronomer, engineer and businessman.

See also
List of asteroids/1–1000

References

External links
 
 

000828
Discoveries by Johann Palisa
Named minor planets
000828
19160829